Dicentrine is an aporphinic alkaloid found in several plant species, mainly from family Lauraceae, including Lindera megaphylla.  At high doses, dicentrine shows antinociceptive activity in a mouse model of pain. It probably acts via a TRPA1-dependent mechanism.

References 

Aporphine alkaloids
Lindera